Hemimarginula  biangulata is a species of sea snail, a marine gastropod mollusk in the family Fissurellidae, the keyhole limpets and slit limpets.

References

 McLean J.H. (2011) Reinstatement of the fissurellid subfamily Hemitominae, with the description of new genera, and proposed evolutionary lineage, based on morphological characters of shell and radula (Gastropoda: Vetigastropoda). Malacologia 54(1-2): 407-427 page(s): 412

External links
 To World Register of Marine Species

Fissurellidae
Gastropods described in 1901